Jwala is a 1969 Indian Malayalam film, directed by M. Krishnan Nair. The film stars Prem Nazir, Sheela, Sharada and Adoor Bhasi in the lead roles. The film had musical score by G. Devarajan.

Cast

Prem Nazir as Ravi
Sheela as Rajamma
Sharada as Kunjomana, Kunjammini (double role)
Adoor Bhasi as Menon
Manavalan Joseph as Police constable
Adoor Pankajam as Panki
Aranmula Ponnamma as Swaraswathi
Kaduvakulam Antony as Police constable
Kottarakkara Sreedharan Nair as Kunjomana's father
N. Govindankutty as Govinda Pilla
Pankajavalli as Meenakshi
S. P. Pillai as Pankan

Soundtrack

References

External links
 

1969 films
1960s Malayalam-language films
Films directed by M. Krishnan Nair